Lake Virginia may refer to:

 Lake Virginia (Minnesota), United States
 Lake Virginia (California), United States
 Lake Virginia (Manawatu-Wanganui), in the city of Whanganui
 Lake Virginia (Fiordland), in Fiordland National Park